Tilly Key, born Latissia Pizano, is an R&B/pop singer from the Island of Corsica. She currently lives in Los Angeles, California.

History
Tilly Key was born Latissia Pizano in Bastia, Corsica, March 1, 1984. Her real name is Latissia Pizano.

Tilly Key started singing at age six and gained recognition in France. She released seven records in Europe, frequently accompanying herself on guitar, piano, and percussion. Her music styles vary between pop, soul and R&B.

After moving to the United States in 2003, Tilly Key worked with Jimmy Jam and Terry Lewis to produce a single for the Hotel Rwanda soundtrack album. Both film and soundtrack were nominated for awards at the Oscars, World Soundtrack Awards, and Golden Globes in 2005.

In 2004 Tilly Key releases a single in Europe "Hot vibes baby" feat French artists, Tragedie, Calvin Scott and STill.

In 2005 Tilly Key tours the US with 13 piece live band for album "Tilly Key".

In 2009 Tilly Key signs a record contract with Mayweather Music, record label from Boxer Floyd Mayweather. Key releases a singled "Higher".

She re-recorded Jealous of My Boogie by RuPaul in 2010. Dubbed "J.O.M.B. 2.0" off the remix album "Drag Race".

In 2010 Tilly Key participated in Usher's "Mon Star" in a song produced by Jimmy Jam & Terry Lewis and written by singer Miguel.

From 2011 to 2013 Tilly Key participates in the production and writing of many French and US artists as well as writing for her next album.

Currently working at Subliminal studios with songwriter and producer London Taylor.

Discography
singles:

1993: "Je veux m'envoler"

1994: "Mama"

1996: "Histoire d'oser" Polygramm

1997: "Exces" Polygramm

1998: "Juste pour une nuit"  E.M.I

2000: L'ombre et LA lumiere Sony/M6

2001: "Ou que j'aille" Sony/M6

2004: "Hot vibes baby" WARNER UP MUSIC

2005: "Somebody Special" KINDRED ENT.

2006: "In his hands" KINDRED ENT.

2009: "higher" MAYWEATHER MUSIC

2010: "J.O.M.B.2" (featuring Rupaul)

2012: "2day" (featuring Shawn Stackz)

Albums
2005: Tilly Key (Kindred Entertainment)

2010: participation in Usher's album "Mon Star"

2010: participation in Rupaul's album Drag Race

Soundtrack contributions

2005: Hotel Rwanda Original Soundtrack: "Ne Me Laisse Pas Seule Ici (Don't Leave Me Here by Myself)"

External links
Youtube 
Tilly Key voice coach
Who is Tilly Key?
Facebook
Tilly Key at CdBaby.com

1984 births
Living people
People from Bastia
French rhythm and blues singers